Carronshore is a village in the Falkirk council area of Scotland.

The village sits north of the River Carron.
According to the 2011 census Carronshore has a population of just under 3,000 residents.

The village has a Primary school located to the north east of the village. It also has three takeaways, 3 convenience stores, a hair salon and a bookmakers.

There are two bars in the village, 'The Vic' and the 'Carronshore Bar' as well as 'The Shore' which is a bar bistro.

The village grew as a port village during the 1700s and 1800s due to its close proximity to the river to the east of the village. 
The area is also very well connected historically to the mining industry and was the site of many pits and collieries until the middle of the 20th century.

See also
List of places in Falkirk council area
River Carron

References

External links

Falkirk Local History Society - Carronshore

Villages in Falkirk (council area)
Grangemouth
Stenhousemuir